Razbor pri Čemšeniku ( or ) is a settlement in the hills north of Izlake in the Municipality of Zagorje ob Savi in central Slovenia. The area is part of the traditional region of Upper Carniola. It is now included with the rest of the municipality in the Central Sava Statistical Region.

The local church is dedicated to Saints Primus and Felician and belongs to the Parish of Čemšenik. It dates to the second half of the 16th century.

References

External links
Razbor pri Čemšeniku on Geopedia

Populated places in the Municipality of Zagorje ob Savi